Primaris Airlines was an American charter airline located in Enterprise, Nevada, in the United States. It operated domestic and international services. Its main base was McCarran International Airport, Las Vegas.

History
The airline was established in 2002 and started operations on June 1, 2004. It had 140 employees (at January 2008). It achieved an FAA certified Part 121 certification in June 2004 as a Domestic, Flag and supplemental operator. It achieved 180 minute ETOPS certification November 3, 2006. Primaris suspended operations December 2, 2008 due to a lack of available funding.

Primaris was Boeing's first US airline customer for its new Boeing 787 Dreamliner aircraft, with an order for 20 aircraft. Primaris planned to use these aircraft to expand its services internationally, but canceled its intent to purchase the new Boeing aircraft in June 2006. No reason was given for the order cancellation.

Primaris operated the Kona Shuttle for a few years from Oakland, CA (OAK) to Kona, Hawaii (KOA).

On October 10, 2008, Primaris Airlines filed for Chapter 11 bankruptcy protection in U.S.Bankruptcy Court, District of Arizona. After several months attempting to secure continuation funding, the CH.11 trustee moved to convert the filing to CH.7 liquidation on March 30, 2009.

Services
Due to lack of scheduled service funding Primaris Airlines remained a small charter airline.

Fleet
The Primaris Airlines fleet included the following aircraft (as of 1 December 2008)

See also 
 List of defunct airlines of the United States

References

External links

 Primaris Airlines domain name expired on 09/26/2009 and is pending renewal or deletion

Companies based in Enterprise, Nevada
Airlines established in 2002
Airlines disestablished in 2009
Companies that filed for Chapter 11 bankruptcy in 2008
2002 establishments in Nevada
Defunct charter airlines of the United States
Airlines based in Nevada
Defunct airlines of the United States